The New Brunswick Society of Certified Engineering Technicians and Technologists or NBSCETT is New Brunswick's independent certifying body for engineering/applied science technicians and technologists. NBSCETT was established in 1968. It confers the designations "C.Tech" and "P. Tech" which are symbols of achievement in engineering/applied science technology and are legally protected for use only by fully certified members. The designations are recognized across Canada by many employers and other engineering professionals through the efforts of provincial associations that make up the Canadian Council of Technicians and Technologists (CCTT). Though CCTT being a signatory, NBSCETT recognizes international transferability through the Sydney Accord, the Dublin Accord and the Engineering Technologist Mobility Forum, which confers the ability to award the designation IntET (Canada) for Technologists who wish to work internationally.

See also
Engineering technologist
Engineering technician

External links
NBSCETT official website

Professional associations based in Canada